Rosenblum is a Jewish surname of German origin, which means "rose flower". Notable people with the surname include:

Adi Rosenblum (born 1962), Israeli artist
Bernard Rosenblum (1927–2007), French artist
Constance Rosenblum (born 1943), American writer
Ellen Rosenblum (born 1951), American politician
Herzl Rosenblum (1903–1991), Israeli journalist and politician
Irit Rosenblum (born 1958), Israeli lawyer and political activist
John Frank Rosenblum (born 1970), American filmmaker
Jonathan Rosenblum (born 1951), American rabbi and journalist
Joshua Rosenblum (born 1963), American musician
Lawrence J. Rosenblum (born 1949), American mathematician
Mary Rosenblum (1952-2018), American writer
Mathew Rosenblum (born 1954), American composer
Mendel Rosenblum (born 1962), American computer scientist
Michael Rosenblum (born 1954), American journalist
Mort Rosenblum (born 1944), American journalist
Nina Rosenblum (born 1950), American filmmaker
Pnina Rosenblum (born 1954), Israeli actress, fashion model, businesswoman and politician
Ralph Rosenblum (1925–1995), American film editor
Rebecca Rosenblum (born 1978), Canadian writer
Robert Rosenblum (1927–2006), American art historian and curator
Steven Rosenblum (born 1954), American film editor
Salomon Rosenblum (1896–1959), Polish nuclear physicist
Walter Rosenblum (1919–2006), American photographer
Yair Rosenblum (1944–1996), Israeli composer and musician

See also
Rosenbaum
Rosenbloom (disambiguation)

German-language surnames
Jewish surnames
Yiddish-language surnames